Veľké Raškovce is a village and municipality in Michalovce District in the Kosice Region of eastern Slovakia.

History
In historical records, the village was first mentioned in 1332.

Geography
The village lies at an altitude of 104 metres and covers an area of 11.998 km². The municipality has a population of about 350 people.

Culture
The village has a cultural centre, a football pitch and a recreational area with fish ponds.

Gallery

See also
 List of municipalities and towns in Michalovce District
 List of municipalities and towns in Slovakia

External links

https://web.archive.org/web/20070513023228/http://www.statistics.sk/mosmis/eng/run.html

Villages and municipalities in Michalovce District